The Inland Valley League is a high school athletic league that is part of the CIF Southern Section. Members are public high schools of Riverside, California and neighboring Moreno Valley.

Members
 Arlington High School
 Canyon Springs High School 
 Lakeside High School (Lake Elsinore, California)
 Vista Del Lago High School (Moreno Valley, California)
 Riverside Polytechnic High School

References

CIF Southern Section leagues